Henricia sexradiata is a species of starfish in the family Echinasteridae. It is native to the western Atlantic Ocean and the Gulf of Mexico.

Distribution and habitat
Henricia sexradiata is found in the tropical and semi-tropical western Atlantic Ocean. Its range extends from South Carolina to Jamaica, the Gulf of Mexico and Nicaragua.

Ecology
Henricia sexradiata can undergo a form of asexual reproduction by undergoing fission, with part of the disc and one or more arms breaking off; the missing parts of each section then regenerate to form two new individuals.

References

Echinasteridae
Starfish described in 1881